William Agnew (9 January 1898 – ?) was a Scottish footballer who played as a forward for Pollok, Ayr United, Falkirk, Port Vale, Arthurlie, and Luton Town.

Career
Agnew played for Pollok, Ayr United and Falkirk, before moving down to England to sign with Port Vale in September 1921. He hit a total of five goals in 31 appearances in the 1921–22 season, and scored his first goal in the Second Division on 29 October, in a 1–0 win at South Shields. However, he was used more sparingly the next season, and scored just one goal in 11 games. After undergoing cartilage operations in the spring of 1923 he was released from his contract at The Old Recreation Ground. He moved on to Arthurlie of the Scottish Third Division, and then returned to the Football League to play for Luton Town.

Career statistics
Source:

References

Footballers from Glasgow
Scottish footballers
Association football forwards
Pollok F.C. players
Ayr United F.C. players
Falkirk F.C. players
Port Vale F.C. players
Luton Town F.C. players
Arthurlie F.C. players
Scottish Junior Football Association players
Scottish Football League players
English Football League players
1898 births
Year of death missing
Place of death missing